Odile Sankara is a Burkinabé artist, actress, playwright and director. She is the President of the Récréâtrales and a younger sister to the late revolutionary leader of Burkina Faso, Thomas Sankara.

Career
Sankara was featured in Iara Lee's 2018 film, Burkinabè Rising: the art of resistance in Burkina Faso.

Filmatography

References

External links
 Odile Sankara on IMDb
 Odile Sankara, sister of the illustrious African leader on Congopage
 Odile Sankara on Jeune Afrique

Burkinabé actors
Burkinabé film producers
Living people
Year of birth missing (living people)
Burkinabé art
Burkinabé artists
21st-century Burkinabé people